ZYP may refer to:
 Zyphe language, ISO 639 language code
 WZYP ("104.3 'ZYP"), a radio station broadcasting in Huntsville, Alabama
 KZYP (Malvern, Arkansas), a former radio station branded Zyp 99 when it closed
 Pennsylvania Station (New York City), IATA code